Rhonda Abrams is a classically trained painter and video artist who was born in 1960 in Montreal, Canada.

Career
Abrams attended the University of Ottawa and obtained a Bachelor of Arts from the school. After this, she continued her education studying at the Banff Centre School of Fine Arts working more specifically in the Studio Arts Department. She holds a Masters of Fine Arts from York University. Her education endowed her with skills in video and performance art, which she used in creating her 1985 piece, "Myth of the Fishes" and 1987 piece “Lament of the Sugar Bush Man.”

"Lament of the Sugar Bush Man” reflects Abrams' care for the environment, which can also be seen through her paintings that accurately reflect any landscape she is immersed in. In her book Canadian Film and Video: A Bibliography and Guide to the Literature Volume 1, author Loren R. Lerner states that Abrams' work is "presented as an evocation of a vision of environmental desperation." Her work is included in the collections of the Museum of Modern Art, New York and the National Gallery of Canada.

References

Further reading
 
 
 Lerner, Loren. Canadian Film and Video A Bibliography and Guide to the Literature Vol 1. University of Toronto Press, Scholarly Publishing Division 9 August 1997 
 
 

1960 births
Canadian women painters
Living people
Canadian video artists
Women video artists
Artists from Montreal
20th-century Canadian women artists
21st-century Canadian women artists
20th-century Canadian painters
21st-century Canadian painters